The Administrative Law Review was established in 1948 and is the official law journal of the American Bar Association Section of Administrative Law & Regulatory Practice.

Overview
The journal is a quarterly publication managed and edited by approximately 80 students at the Washington College of Law. The 2022–2023 editor-in-chief is Jacob W. Wohl. 

The journal is ranked 49th out of 1,556 nationally ranked law journals. For specialty law journals, the journal is ranked 7th out of 1,224. In the category of Administrative Law, it is ranked 2nd.
The journal has been cited by the United States Court of Appeals for the District of Columbia Circuit (which is known as the administrative law circuit), and since 2000 has been cited by the Second, Third, Fourth, Fifth, Sixth, Seventh, Ninth, Tenth, and Eleventh Circuit Courts of Appeal. It also continues to be cited by the Supreme Court of the United States.

Abstracting and indexing
The journal is abstracted and indexed in:
Current Contents/Social and Behavioral Sciences
EBSCO databases
HeinOnline
ProQuest databases
Scopus
Social Sciences Citation Index
According to the Journal Citation Reports, the journal has a 2019 impact factor of 2.059.

Admissions

The journal selects staff members based on a competitive exercise that tests candidates on their editing, research, legal-analysis, and legal-writing skills. There is not a preset number of accepted candidates each year; recent classes of new editors have ranged from about 45 to 50. The candidate "write-on" exercise is distributed to candidates during their second semester at the law school. An optional "grade-on" process allows students to become staff members based solely on their grades. Transfer students are also eligible for admission through a fall write-on process.

References

External links
 
 American Bar Association: Section of Administrative Law & Regulatory Practice

American law journals
American Bar Association
American University
Administrative law journals
Quarterly journals
Publications established in 1948
English-language journals
Law journals edited by students